The National Court Register is the official company register of Poland. Launched in 2001, it is jointly administered by the Ministry of Justice and the regional courts. Most companies and organisations in Poland must register in order to legally conduct their activities, and only companies with a physical presence in Poland may register. Registered companies are afforded certain rights, including protection of their name. In the years following its introduction, the register underwent gradual digitalisation and since 2021 is only available electronically.

Background
Proposals by the Ministry of Justice outlining the creation of a national business register passed into law in the Sejm on 20 August 1997. It was designed to replace the previous system of 12 separate directories, which had been in place since 1934, and to make the information contained within more accessible both to businesses and the public. The new National Court Register (NCR) came into force on 1 January 2001 and comprises three main parts: a register of businesses, a register of other groups such as professional organisations, not-for-profit foundations and public health institutions and a register of bankrupt debtors. These contain data such as the names and addresses of the company and its board members, any articles of association, financial returns and information around insolvency proceedings. Certain types of business, including investment firms and pension providers, are exempt from registration. Companies incorporated before 2001 had to re-register on the NCR in order to continue trading legally.

Legal rights
Once a business is registered it acquires the status of a legal entity and is able to carry out business lawfully. All new entries on the NCR are published in an accompanying journal called the Court Monitor, which is published every weekday. Registered companies enjoy certain protections under Polish law; no new company may use the same name as an existing registered company in the same town or city, and companies can also prevent others from using their trading name if different from the registered name.

Only companies based in Poland are allowed to register on the NCR. International companies must therefore open an office in the country before registering, which can only be registered if the Polish company is involved in similar business activities to its parent. In the case of a merger or acquisition, the newly formed company must re-register and any old records must be removed.

Digitalisation
The NCR has incorporated digital elements from its introduction; a publicly-accessible search engine allowed users to locate records on the register, although this data was also available via the NCR Central Information Office (CIO). Work to combine the NCR with data from municipality-level business records into a computerised system began in 2007. A comprehensive programme of digitalisation was carried out between 2012 and 2015 at a cost of just under 1.5 million złoty. Following this, all actions within the register were available electronically, including the downloading of PDF documents, which were granted the same legal status as ones obtained from the CIO.

Since 1 July 2021, the NCR has been completely electronic. Paper applications are no longer accepted and documents may only be obtained via the online system rather than from the CIO. Before this change, only around 10 percent of submissions were made online.

References

Polish business law
Databases in Poland
Public records